Andreas Dibowski (born 29 March 1966 in Hamburg) is a German eventing rider. With his horse Butts Leon he won a gold medal in team eventing at the 2008 Summer Olympics.

He is based in Dohle, near Hamburg in North Germany where he runs his own training yard.

Career
Aged 15 Andreas began training as a groom at the National Riding School in Hoya followed by two years in California in a show jumping yard. On returning to Germany he began teaching and became National Champion (1989) with Just Be Fair.

In 1991 he competed in the Bundeschampionat (the national championships for young horses) with three horses in three different disciplines and two years later enjoyed his first international success in eventing when placed second in the CCI** at Falsterbo with FRH Amadeus. Within seven years and success with several horses he was selected for the German Olympic team in Sydney 2000 with Andora (team 4th) then Athens 2004 and was a member of the team that won Olympic gold in Beijing (2008).

Andreas has won 3 four* events

Pau 2010 - FRH Fantasia

Luhmuhlen 2011 - Butts Leon

Luhmuhlen 2016 - It's Me xxx

He currently has several international horses in training including the eventing stallion Mighty Magic with whom he won the World Young Horse Championships at Le Lions in 2010, Butts Avedon also by Heraldik and Leon's half brother Butts Leonardo R (out of the same mare but by the trakehner Buddenbruck).

Personal life
He is married to rider Susanna and the couple has three children. As an aside to eventing, Andreas enjoys breeding doves and exotic birds.

He is 1.81m tall and weighs 73 kg.

References

External links 

 
 
 
 

German event riders
Olympic gold medalists for Germany
Equestrians at the 2000 Summer Olympics
Equestrians at the 2004 Summer Olympics
Equestrians at the 2008 Summer Olympics
Olympic equestrians of Germany
German male equestrians
1966 births
Sportspeople from Hamburg
Living people
Olympic medalists in equestrian
Medalists at the 2008 Summer Olympics